Michael "Magic" McLean (born 3 March 1965) is a former professional Australian rules footballer who played for the Footscray Football Club, Brisbane Bears and Brisbane Lions in the Australian Football League (AFL).

Early life 
McLean was born and raised in the Northern Territory and played both rugby league and Australian football at junior levels. His father, from Queensland pushed for Michael at fifteen years of age to pursue a career in rugby league, however, he decided to continue playing Australian football.

McLean played his first senior league with the Nightcliff rugby league club but also played Australian football for the Nightcliff Football Club in the Northern Territory Football League where he was eventually scouted by the Footscray Football Club to play professionally.

VFL/AFL career

Footscray career 
McLean moved to Victoria and debuted for Footscray in 1983.  He became known as a skilful winger who went on to play 95 games and boot 23 goals with the Bulldogs before he suffered an ankle and calf injuries that hampered his career. In response to his injuries, McLean focused on building his lean body to become one of the strongest physiques in the competition.

Brisbane career
The Bulldogs gave McLean the boot, before he was picked up in the 1991 pre-season draft as the first overall pick for the Brisbane Bears. He resurrected his career, winning the 1991 and 1993 best and fairest award at the Bears. He went on to play 87 games and kick 17 goals with the Bears, before playing the first game in 1997 with the newly merged Brisbane Lions before constant calf injury struck him down, forcing his retirement.

Coaching career
McLean returned to Darwin to coach his former club Nightcliff, he did so for five years with limited success before resigning at the end of 2004 to coach the Redland Football Club in the Queensland State League. At the end of the 2005, as Redland seemed destined for the wooden spoon, he resigned and returned to Darwin to again coach Nightcliff.  In the 2005–06 season, McLean gave the Tigers an impressive season and reached the preliminary final before bowing out to eventual premiers, the Darwin Football Club. In the 2006–07 season, McLean became coach for the Southern Districts Football Club and won the premiership in his first year as coach with the club. In 2009, he became the head coach of the Northern Territory Football Club and coached their inaugural season in the Queensland Australian Football League (QAFL). In May 2016, he was announced as the new senior coach of the Waratah Football Club heading into the 2016–17 NTFL season.

Aboriginal activist
During his career he was a strong anti-racism advocate, and this continued post his career. He was a vital part of the Aboriginal All-Stars match up in Darwin, and was also named in the Indigenous Team of the Century.

In 2007, McLean was working at Palmerston YMCA in Darwin as a community worker.

References

External links

Western Bulldogs players
Brisbane Bears players
1965 births
Living people
Brisbane Lions players
Indigenous Australian players of Australian rules football
Brisbane Bears Club Champion winners
All-Australians (1953–1988)
Nightcliff Football Club players
Australian rules footballers from the Northern Territory
Allies State of Origin players